Lewis and Sarah Boggs House is a historic home located in Center Township, Marshall County, Indiana. It was built about 1855, and is a two-story, Greek Revival style I-house with a rear ell. It has a side gable roof and sits on a split-face granite foundation.  It features corner boards that form Doric order pilasters.

It was listed on the National Register of Historic Places in 2012.

References

Houses on the National Register of Historic Places in Indiana
Greek Revival houses in Indiana
Houses completed in 1855
Buildings and structures in Marshall County, Indiana
National Register of Historic Places in Marshall County, Indiana